On 24 March 2022, a rocket strike by the Russian Armed Forces killed 6 civilians and wounded 15 more during the battle of Kharkiv, part of the 2022 Russian invasion of Ukraine. The Russian Army used 9N210/9N235 cluster munition and BM-27 Uragan multiple rocket launcher in the attack. Due to the indiscriminate nature of these weapons used in densely populated areas, Amnesty International described these strikes as a possible Russian war crime.

Attack 
On 24 March 2022, a Russian missile strike hit a shopping mall parking lot near the Akademika Pavlova metro station. At the time, hundreds of people were waiting outside a post office in the mall to obtain humanitarian aid. After the strike, the people panicked and ran away from the scene of the crime. Six people were killed and at least 15 further were injured.  A local police officer recalled that "shrapnel was falling like rain". Two further cluster bombings damaged the nearby Holy Trinity Church where volunteers were preparing humanitarian aid. Shrapnel fell through the church's wall and roof.

Investigations 
Amnesty International found evidence of Russian forces repeatedly using 9N210/9N235 cluster munitions as well as scatterable mines, both of which are subject to international treaty bans - Convention on Cluster Munitions and Ottawa Treaty. Amnesty International concluded that these indiscriminate attacks, resulting in civilian deaths, are war crimes.

See also
 Mykolaiv cluster bombing
 February 2022 Kharkiv cluster bombing
 April 2022 Kharkiv cluster bombing

References

Cluster bomb attacks
Russian war crimes in Ukraine
March 2022 events in Ukraine
Mass murder in 2022
2020s building bombings
War crimes during the 2022 Russian invasion of Ukraine
Battle of Kharkiv (2022)
Attacks on buildings and structures in 2022
Attacks on buildings and structures in Ukraine
March 2022 crimes in Europe
Airstrikes during the 2022 Russian invasion of Ukraine
Use of cluster munition during the Russian invasion of Ukraine
21st-century mass murder in Ukraine
2020s in Kharkiv
Airstrikes conducted by Russia